Chen Peitong (July 20, 1989) is a Chinese figure skater.

Programs

Competitive highlights

References 

 
 

1989 births
Living people
Chinese male single skaters
Figure skaters from Changchun